The Robert W. Williams Plantation was a small cotton plantation located in of approximately  located in northern Leon County, Florida, U.S. established by Robert W. Williams.

Location 
The Robert W. Williams Plantation was located on the south shore of Lake Iamonia.

Plantation specifics 
The Leon County Florida 1860 Agricultural Census shows that the Robert W. Williams Plantation had the following:
 Improved Land: 
 Unimproved Land: 
 Cash value of plantation: $8,000
 Cash value of farm implements/machinery: $300
 Cash value of farm animals: N/A
 Number of slaves: 37
Bushels of corn: N/A
Bales of cotton: N/A

The owner 
Robert W. Williams was an attorney and represented the Marquis de Lafayette and his heirs over the Lafayette lands. Williams also belonged to the National Agricultural Society and served as vice-president from 1841-1842 and was considered a scientific farmer

References 
Rootsweb Plantations
Largest Slaveholders from 1860 Slave Census Schedules
Paisley, Clifton; From Cotton To Quail, University of Florida Press, c1968.

Plantations in Leon County, Florida
Cotton plantations in Florida